Lindbergh High School may refer to:

Lindbergh High School (Missouri), located in St. Louis, Missouri
Lindbergh High School (Washington), located in Renton, Washington